La terre est ronde is a French expression meaning "world is round".

It may refer to:

"La terre est ronde", single by Orelsan from his 2011 album Le chant des sirènes
La terre est ronde, 1937 play by Armand Salacrou
Le terre est ronde, 1960 film by Philippe Ducrest

See also
The World Is Round (disambiguation)